The Centre for Adult Education (CAE), founded in 1947 as the Council of Adult Education, is an adult education institution based in Victoria, Australia. It runs short courses and nationally recognised training, as well as a Victorian Certificate of Education (VCE) program. It is a statutory authority under the Education and Training Reform Act 2006. It is partly funded by the state government's Adult Community and Further Education Division.

Notable staff 
 Colin Badger (1906–1993), director, Council of Adult Education
 Margaret Geddes – editing and non-fiction teacher (2011–present); writer, journalist, historian

References

External links 
 

Education in Victoria (Australia)
1947 establishments in Australia
Adult education in Australia